"Right Now" is a song written by Al Lewis and Sylvester Bradford, and recorded by Rock 'n' Roll singer Gene Vincent and his Blue Caps on 15 December 1957. The song was not released until 1959, when the Blue Caps had disbanded.

Mary Chapin Carpenter recording
It was covered by American country music artist Mary Chapin Carpenter.  It was released in January 1991 as the second single from her album Shooting Straight in the Dark.  The song reached number 15 on the Billboard Hot Country Singles & Tracks chart in April 1991.

Chart performance

References

1991 singles
1957 songs
Mary Chapin Carpenter songs
Columbia Records singles
Songs written by Al Lewis (lyricist)
Gene Vincent songs